is a railway station in the city of Toyokawa, Aichi Prefecture, Japan, operated by Central Japan Railway Company (JR Tōkai).  It is also a freight terminal for the Japan Freight Railway Company (JR Freight).

Lines
Toyokawa Station is served by the Iida Line, and is located 8.7 kilometers from the southern terminus of the line at Toyohashi Station.

Station layout
The station has one island platform and one side platform connected by a footbridge. The station building was rebuilt in 1997 as an elevated station. The station building has automated ticket machines, TOICA automated turnstiles and a Midori no Madoguchi staffed ticket office.

Platforms

Adjacent stations

|-
!colspan=5|Central Japan Railway Company

Station history
At the time, the line consisted of Toyohashi Station, Ushikubo Station, and this station, in that order, but the line was soon extended on to  later that year. In December 1931 a modern, 3-story concrete station building was completed. A spur line, the Nishi-Toyokawa Line, connected to the station on May 12, 1942. On August 1, 1943, the Toyokawa Railway was nationalized along with some other local lines to form the Japanese Government Railways (JGR) Iida Line. The Nishi-Toyokawa Line ceased operation in 1956. Scheduled freight operations were discontinued in 1984. Along with its division and privatization of JNR on April 1, 1987, the station came under the control and operation of the Central Japan Railway Company (JR Tōkai).

Passenger statistics
In fiscal 2017, the station was used by an average of 3296 passengers daily.

Surrounding area
Toyokawa Inari
 Toyokawa High School

See also
 List of Railway Stations in Japan

References

External links

Railway stations in Japan opened in 1897
Railway stations in Aichi Prefecture
Iida Line
Stations of Central Japan Railway Company
Stations of Japan Freight Railway Company
Toyokawa, Aichi